Runa Sandvik is a computer security expert, known as a proponent of strong encryption.  She worked as The New York Times senior director of information security between March 2016 and October 2019. As of 2021, she is a senior advisor for the Norwegian Cyber Defence Force.

Career 

Sandvik was an early developer of the Tor anonymity network, a cooperative facility that helps individuals obfuscate the internet protocol they are using to access the internet. Sandvik is a technical advisor to the Freedom of the Press Foundation and serves on the review board of Black Hat Europe. Sandvik interviewed Edward Snowden in May 2014. In February 2015 Sandvik documented her efforts to retrieve information about herself through Freedom of Information Act requests. Sandvik led efforts to make The New York Times a Tor Onion service, allowing Times employees and readers to access the newspaper's site in ways that impede intrusive government monitoring.

Hacking of smart rifles 

Sandvik, and her husband, Michael Auger, demonstrated how smart rifles with remote access can be remotely hacked. The $13,000 TrackingPoint sniper rifle is equipped with an embedded linux computer. According to Wired magazine, when used according to its specifications, the aiming computer can enable a novice to hit remote targets that would otherwise require a skilled marksman. However the manufacturers designed the aiming computer with WiFi capabilities, so the shooter could upload video of their shots. Sandvik and Auger found they could initiate a Unix shell command line interpreter, and use it to alter parameters the aiming computer relies on, so that it will always miss its targets. They found that a knowledgeable hacker could use the shell to acquire root access. Acquiring root access allowed an interloper to erase all the aiming computer's software—"bricking" the aiming computer.

Personal life
She acquired her first computer when she was fifteen years old. She studied computer science at the Norwegian University of Science and Technology. In 2014 Sandvik married Michael Auger, and the pair made their home in Washington, D.C.

References

External links
Snowden interview

1988 births

Living people
InfoSec Twitter
Norwegian women
People associated with computer security